Jin Seong-tae (Hangul: 진성태; born  in Seoul) is a South Korean male volleyball player. He currently plays for the Incheon Korean Air Jumbos in the V-League.

Career

Clubs
Jin was selected by the Hyundai Capital Skywalkers with the second pick of the second round (ninth overall) in the 2014 V-League Draft.

In the 2015-16 season, Jin became the Skywalkers' starting middle blocker alongside Choi Min-ho and posted career-highs in hitting percentage (58.25%), blocks per set (0.43) and points (163).

In the late of the 2015-16 season, three-time block per set champion Shin Yung-suk finished the military service and returned to the Skywalkers. With veteran middles Choi Min-ho and Shin Yung-suk on the 2016-17 Skywalkers' squad, Jin was projected to struggle to earn a starting spot. In the beginning of the 2016-17 season, Jin was eventually traded to the Korean Air Jumbos.

National team
In 2010 Jin got called up to the South Korean national under-18 team for the 2010 Asian Youth Championship where his team won the bronze medal. Next year, he participated in the 2011 World Youth Championship as part of the national youth team.

As a member of the South Korean national under-20 team, Jin also competed in the Asian Junior Championship in 2010 and 2012.

While attending Kyung Hee University, Jin took part in the 2013 Summer Universiade and the 2014 AVC Cup as a member of the South Korean collegiate national team.

In June 2016 Jin was first selected for the South Korean senior national team to compete at the 2016 FIVB World League.

References

External links
 Jin Seong-tae at the International Volleyball Federation (FIVB)

1993 births
Living people
South Korean men's volleyball players
21st-century South Korean people